Dalbar Malek Baqar (also Romanized as Dalbar Maleḵ Bāqar) is a village in Khavashod Rural District, Rud Ab District, Sabzevar County, Razavi Khorasan Province, Iran. At the 2006 census, its population was 10, in 4 families.

References 

Populated places in Sabzevar County